Cauchy's functional equation is the functional equation:

A function  that solves this equation is called an additive function.  Over the rational numbers, it can be shown using elementary algebra that there is a single family of solutions, namely  for any rational constant   Over the real numbers, the family of linear maps  now with  an arbitrary real constant, is likewise a family of solutions; however there can exist other solutions not of this form that are extremely complicated. However, any of a number of regularity conditions, some of them quite weak, will preclude the existence of these pathological solutions.  For example, an additive function  is linear if:
  is continuous (proven by Cauchy in 1821).  This condition was weakened in 1875 by Darboux who showed that it is only necessary for the function to be continuous at one point.
  is monotonic on any interval.
  is bounded on any interval.
  is Lebesgue measurable.
On the other hand, if no further conditions are imposed on  then (assuming the axiom of choice) there are infinitely many other functions that satisfy the equation.  This was proved in 1905 by Georg Hamel using Hamel bases. Such functions are sometimes called Hamel functions.

The fifth problem on Hilbert's list is a generalisation of this equation. Functions where there exists a real number  such that  are known as Cauchy-Hamel functions and are used in Dehn-Hadwiger invariants which are used in the extension of Hilbert's third problem from 3D to higher dimensions.

This equation is sometimes referred to as Cauchy's additive functional equation to distinguish it from Cauchy's exponential functional equation  Cauchy's logarithmic functional equation  and Cauchy's multiplicative functional equation

Solutions over the rational numbers 

Theorem: Let  be an additive function. Then  is -linear.

Let .

First note , hence , and therewith  from which follows .

Via induction,  is proved for any .

For any negative integer  we know , therefore . Thus far we have proved
 for any .

Let , then  and hence .

, q.e.d.

Properties of nonlinear solutions over the real numbers

We prove below that any other solutions must be highly pathological functions. 
In particular, it is shown that any other solution must have the property that its graph  is dense in  that is, that any disk in the plane (however small) contains a point from the graph. 
From this it is easy to prove the various conditions given in the introductory paragraph.

Existence of nonlinear solutions over the real numbers

The linearity proof given above also applies to  where  is a scaled copy of the rationals. Thus, in general, we have  for all  and   However, as we will demonstrate below, highly pathological solutions can be found for functions  based on these linear solutions, by viewing the reals as a vector space over the field of rational numbers. Note, however, that this method is nonconstructive, relying as it does on the existence of a (Hamel) basis for any vector space, a statement proved using Zorn's lemma. (In fact, the existence of a basis for every vector space is logically equivalent to the axiom of choice.)    

In particular, the solutions of the functional equation are linear if and only if  is constant over all   Thus, in a sense, despite the inability to exhibit a nonlinear solution, "most" (in the sense of cardinality) solutions to the Cauchy functional equation are actually nonlinear and pathological.

See also

References

External links

 Solution to the Cauchy Equation Rutgers University
 The Hunt for Addi(c)tive Monster
 

Functional equations